The 1997 Liga Indonesia Premier Division Final was a football match which was played on 28 July 1997 at Gelora Senayan Main Stadium in Jakarta. It was contested by Persebaya Surabaya and Bandung Raya to determine the winner of the 1996–97 Liga Indonesia Premier Division. Persebaya won the match 3–1 to claim their first-ever professional title.

Road to the final

Match details

References

External links 

 Liga Indonesia Premier Division standings

Liga Indonesia Premier Division finals
1997 in Indonesian sport